Nea Flogita (Greek: Νέα Φλογητά, Φλογητά), is a coastal village in Chalkidiki, Greece, 52 km from Thessaloniki and 6 km from Nea Moudania. The village, in the municipality of Nea Propontida, is built on a hill overlooking the Thermaikos Gulf. Most of the village is only a few minutes from the sea, and on a clear day, there is a wonderful view across the bay to Mount Olympus.

Flogita was founded in 1923, when refugees fleeing the Anatolian destruction in Cappadocia (in modern Turkey) assembled to build New Flogita. 

Flogita has 1,604 permanent residents, according to the 2011 census. This number increases hugely in the summer months, when visitor numbers raise the population to 20,000.

Tourism

Flogita is a popular tourist resort, particularly in the summer, and as a result facilities and amusements have increased to cater for the influx. Flogita is noted for its big sandy beach, roughly one kilometre long, and its paved promenade which is popular in the evenings for the customary "volta", or walk. The sea is particularly warm. The sea floor is shallow, which has resulted in the popularity of marine sports in the village.

Along the sea front there are many tavernas, fast foods shops, confectioners, beach bar cafes, and nightclubs. The atmosphere in the height of the summer season is that of a “party style village”. In the "off" season, Flogita is very quiet.

Climate

The climate in Western Chalkidiki is mild enough that even the wintry months allow some sunshine in the daytime. Summer is characterized by hot days and warm evenings.

References

External links
 360 degree virtual panoramas from Nea Flogita
 Virtual tour 360° and accommodation info about Flogita, 360sites.gr

Populated places in Chalkidiki